Monica Garza (born in Alamogordo, New Mexico) is an American artist of Mexican and Korean background based in Atlanta, Georgia. She specializes in painting care-free, ethically and racially ambiguous women of color, of all body types. She is known for nude, contemporary portraits, contemporary figurative painting, sex and racial ethnicity, ceramic, text, and sculpture work.

Biography 
Born in 1988 in Alamogordo, New Mexico, Garza has a multi-cultural background with a Mexican father, and Korean mother. Garza resides in Atlanta, Georgia, where she focuses on her art after traveling on and off consistently. Her art work depicts women of different shades of brown, displaying the nude body, while playing sports, texting, working out, and the average modern-day leisure activities. Garza focuses on themes of sex positivity, self portraits, and modern day technology in her artwork. She emphasizes being unapologetically herself, when creating nude portraits of women doing the normal day-to-day functions. She creates her paintings based on her own cultural background and memories, which mainly exhibit women of color.

Education 
When Garza was 18 years old, she attended Syracruse University until she left to travel to Kibera, Kenya. Soon after, Garza attended California College of the Arts in San Francisco, where she earned a BFA in painting and drawing.

Artworks

Bonjour De Monique, 2018 
This art piece by Garza consists of acrylic, wool, embroidery string, and oil pastel on canvas. It is held in the VI Gallery at the Mine II show. This piece displays a woman who appears to be enjoying her solitude in her own space. The color scheme is a soft pink, and a dark blue. The background displays a chaotic area with cups, utensils, and plants.

Desayuno 17, 2017 
This art piece by Garza consists of acrylic and oil pastel on canvas. It is held in the VI Gallery at the "Copenhagen V Show.  This piece displays two racially  ambiguous  women very close to each other, sitting down on separate chairs. Their bodies are connecting through the palm of their hands.

Spf, 2016 
This art piece by Garza consists of acrylic and oil pastel on paper. This piece by Garza displays a woman, specifically a woman of color, laying on a red rectangular object. The woman in the painting is nude, with a blue rectangular object adjacent to the red object. Fruit is also displayed in the painting, above the woman.

Exhibitions

Solo exhibitions 

 2019 Laredo, V1 Gallery V 
 2017 Monica Kim Garza: Jangalang, New Image Art, West Hollywood

Group shows 

 2019
 One Thousand and One Nights, Artual Gallery, Beirut
 2018 
MINE II, V1 Gallery, Copenhagen V
 Drawing Room, Over the Influence, Hong Kong 
 'EXTRA, The Hole, New York 
The Beyond: Georgia O'Keeffe and Contemporary Art, North Carolina Museum of Art, North Carolina
 2017 
 Mine- Art, signed books, exhibition catalogues, artist books, collectibles, editions, posters, rarities, prints, and free stuff, V1 Gallery, Copenhagen V
 Nude- Group exhibition, v1 Gallery, Copenhagen V 
 2016 
 Character, V1 Gallery, Copenhagen V 
 LIFEFORCE, The Untitled Space, New York

Collections 
Garza's work has been held at Crystal Bridges Museum in Bentonville, Arkansas, V1 Gallery in Copenhagen V, and New Image Art Gallery in West Hollywood, CA.

References

External links 

 Monica Garza on Nalgas and Kimchi 
 Monica Garza on Bese 
 Monica Kim Garza: On Coming Home 
 Monica Garza in Think Tank Gallery & Showroom 
 Monica Garza in Paper Darts 

1988 births
California College of the Arts alumni
American artists
American artists of Mexican descent
American artists of Korean descent
Living people